8 Soothing Songs for Rut is the second studio album by the Norwegian rock band Motorpsycho, then still tinged in hard rock and grunge metal. It was first released as vinyl-only-mini-album called "Soothe" but later re-released on CD with two additional tracks from the single "3 Songs For Rut". Both titles were merged into "8 Soothing Songs For Rut". The music is very raw and hard, but also shows glimpses of Prog, as in the nearly 10-minute-long "Lighthouse Girl".

Track listing

CD

LP "Soothe"

Personnel 
Bent Sæther: vocals, bass, guitars, piano, percussion
Hans Magnus Ryan: guitars, taurus, piano, back. vocals
Håkon Gebhardt: drums, percussion

with:
Lars Lien: back. vocals on "California Dreamin'"

References 

1992 albums
Motorpsycho albums